Anarta mutata, or the mutant, is a species of cutworm or dart moth in the family Noctuidae.

The MONA or Hodges number for Anarta mutata is 10224.

References

Further reading

 
 
 

Anarta (moth)
Articles created by Qbugbot
Moths described in 1913